Central and Eastern Europe

The Intermarium Region includes a group of geographically contiguous Central and Eastern European countries that share a common historical, social and cultural identity. Many were buffer socialist republics, either having been Soviet republics or otherwise subordinate to the USSR. As a region, the countries form a land buffer from the Baltic Sea to the Black Sea which may balance future Russian influence in Europe.

The term has gained use in the context of the Russian invasion of Ukraine as humanitarian and military aid have been offered to Ukraine, thereby increasing its defence resources (GDP).  Support for Ukraine also included numerous countries condemning Russian actions and imposing sanctions, including Estonia, Hungary, Latvia, Lithuania, Poland, Romania, Slovakia.  Other support includes: accelerated and expanded energy projects, communication projects, and various NATO defence projects including NATO Enhanced Forward Presence.

Etymology 
The definition of the Intermarium Region as a geopolitical centre does not refer to the similarly named concept put forward by Józef Piłsudski for the federalisation of European states. The term  "Intermarium Region" refers to close cooperation within the European Union. The formation of the Eastern Partnership, as well as Benelux and the Visegrád Group, and later the Three Seas Initiative created a regional dialogue on questions affecting the member states.  The Lublin Triangle was established to strengthen mutual military, cultural, economic and political cooperation and to support Ukraine's integration into the European Union and NATO.

Geopolitics 
Countries close to the border with Ukraine and Russia are exposed to the impact of Russian energy blackmail and economic impact of the Russian invasion of Ukraine.  The Intermarium region, together with the countries of the European Union accelerated energy, communications, defence projects and will participate in the reconstruction of Ukraine. Which has become an official candidate for membership of the European Union. This will enable these countries to form a buffer from the Baltic Sea to the Black Sea in the future, balancing Russian imperial influence in Europe. The American geopolitician George Friedman refer of the Intermarium region in their works or speeches.

See also 

 Intermarium
 Lublin Triangle
 Three Seas Initiative
 Visegrád Group
 British–Polish–Ukrainian trilateral pact

References 

Regions of Europe
Russo-Ukrainian War
European integration
Intermarium